Rodzina zastępcza (eng. Foster Family) was a popular Polish primetime comedy series broadcast on Polsat from 23 February 1999 to 20 December 2009. In 2004 the title was changed to Rodzina zastępcza plus (Foster Family plus) and the series got longer episodes, as well as more regular characters and locations.

The series told the story of the Kwiatkowski family, Anka and Jacek, their biological children Majka and Filip, as well as three children they adopted one day: Eliza, Zosia, Romek, later also Dorotka, Wojtek, Piotrek and Pawełek.

Cast 
 †Gabriela Kownacka  as Anna Kwiatkowska (1999–2008)
 Piotr Fronczewski as Jacek Kwiatkowski (1999–2009)
 Monika Mrozowska as Maja Kwiatkowska / Potulicka (1999–2009)
 Leszek Zduń as Kuba Potulicki (2004–2009)
 Sergiusz Żymełka as Filip Kwiatkowski (1999–2009)
 Aleksander Ihnatowicz as Romek Latosz (1999–2007)
 Aleksandra Szwed as Eliza (1999–2009)
 Marcin Korcz as Michał Kercz (2008–2009)
 Misheel Jargalsajkhan as Zosia (1999–2007)
 Wiktoria Gąsiewska as Dorotka (2007–2009)
 Michał Włodarczyk as Wojtek (2007–2009)
 Adam Zdrójkowski as Piotruś (2009)
 Jakub Zdrójkowski as Pawełek (2009)
 Maryla Rodowicz as Ula (1999–2009)
 Hanna Śleszyńska as Jadzia (2001–2009)
 Joanna Trzepiecińska as Alutka Kossoń (2000–2009)
 Tomasz Dedek as Jędrula Kossoń (2000–2009)
 Jarosław Boberek as Police Officer (1999–2009)
 †Stanisław Michalski as Kuba's grandfather (2004–2009)
 Joanna Kurowska as Krystyna Kercz (2008–2009)
 Krzysztof Dracz as Włodzimierz Kercz (2008–2009)
 †Marcin Kołodyński as Darek - Majka's Boyfriend (1999–2001)
 Jerzy Słonka as Lesio, Jadzia's husband (2003–2009)
 Borys Szyc as Krzyś Kozłowski (2002)
 Wojciech Janowicz as Jaś Potulicki, #1 (2009)

External links
Unofficial Homepage
Rodzina zastępcza at IMDb
Rodzina zastępcza plus at IMDb

1999 Polish television series debuts
Polish comedy-drama television series
Television shows set in Warsaw
Polsat original programming